These are the official results of the athletics competition at the 2009 Jeux de la Francophonie which took place on 1–6 October 2009 in Beirut, Lebanon.

Men's results

100 meters

Heats – October 1Wind:Heat 1: +2.3 m/s, Heat 2: +3.5 m/s, Heat 3: +0.3 m/s, Heat 4: +0.9 m/s, Heat 5: +0.3 m/s

Semi-finals – October 1Wind:Heat 1: +2.1 m/s, Heat 2: +2.4 m/s, Heat 3: +2.5 m/s

Final – October 2Wind: +4.6 m/s

200 meters

Heats – October 4Wind:Heat 1: -2.3 m/s, Heat 2: -2.5 m/s, Heat 3: -1.9 m/s, Heat 4: -3.3 m/s

Semi-finals – October 4Wind:Heat 1: -1.5 m/s, Heat 2: +0.6 m/s

Final – October 5Wind: -0.2 m/s

400 meters

Heats – October 2

Final – October 3

800 meters

Heats – October 4

Final – October 5

1500 meters
October 2

5000 meters
October 4

10,000 meters
October 1

Marathon
October 4

110 meters hurdles
October 5Wind: -0.1 m/s

400 meters hurdles

Heats – October 1

Final – October 2

3000 meters steeplechase
October 3

4 × 100 meters relay
Heats – October 3

Final – October 3

4 × 400 meters relay
October 5

20 kilometers walk
October 3

High jump
October 5

Pole vault
October 4

Long jump
October 2

Triple jump
October 4

Shot put
October 5

Discus throw
October 1

Hammer throw
October 2

Javelin throw
October 5

Decathlon
October 1–2

Women's results

100 meters

Heats – October 1Wind:Heat 1: +1.3 m/s, Heat 2: +0.4 m/s, Heat 3: +4.9 m/s

Final – October 2Wind:+2.2 m/s

200 meters

Heats – October 4Wind:Heat 1: +1.3 m/s, Heat 2: +2.1 m/s

Final – October 5Wind:-0.8 m/s

400 meters

Heats – October 2

Final – October 3

800 meters

Heats – October 1

Final – October 3

1500 meters
October 5

5000 meters
October 5

10,000 meters
October 2

Marathon
October 4

100 meters hurdles

Heats – October 1Wind:Heat 1: +1.3 m/s, Heat 2: +1.2 m/s

Final – October 2Wind:+1.0 m/s

400 meters hurdles
October 4

3000 meters steeplechase
October 4

4 × 100 meters relay
October 3

4 × 400 meters relay
October 5

10 kilometers walk
October 3

High jump
October 2

Pole vault
October 2

Long jump
October 3

Triple jump
October 5

Shot put
October 1

Discus throw
October 3

Hammer throw
October 4

Javelin throw
October 1

Heptathlon
October 3–4

References
Results

Jeux de la Francophonie
2009